Chaim Gliksberg  (1904, Pinsk – 1970, Tel Aviv) was an Israeli painter who lived and worked in Tel Aviv.

Early life and studies
Chaim Gliksberg was born in Pinsk, then in the Russian Empire, to Rabbi Shimon Yaakov Gliksberg and Cypa Mejta, daughter of Rabbi Mordechai Dovid Alpert. When he was 2 years old his family moved to Odessa. He attended cheder and the Odessa yeshiva.

In 1918 he attended the Bershadsky School of Art in Odessa. From 1920 to 1924 he studied in the city’s Art Academy under Professor Dvornikov and academician Costandi, names well known in the Russian arts’ world.

Life and work in Israel
Arriving in Eretz Israel in 1925 he went straight to Jerusalem. He worked in Bezalel and later in road paving. Despite living hardships he painted a great deal.  In 1927 his first exhibit went on display at the Lemel School under the auspices of the Hebrew Artists Association in Eretz Israel. In 1929 the artist moved to Tel Aviv where he taught and maintained a studio. In 1930 he held a one-man show in Ohel Shem, which Hayyim Nahman Bialik opened with an enthusiastic speech.

Gliksberg was not only a wonderful portraitist and an excellent artist who delved deep into the souls of his subjects, but also a gifted writer and connoisseur of music. Distinguished authors and artists such as Hayyim Nahman Bialik,  Alter Druyanov and Gershon Shofman were fond of him and held him in great esteem. It seems that there was no other painter for whom Bialik sat so often. The seven portraits of Bialik painted by Gliksberg which feature the poet in summer clothes and winter clothes, with his walking stick, pouch and wide-rimmed hat are among the best portraits of Israel's national poet. Chaim Gliksberg's record of conversations he engaged in with Bialik during the sittings were assembled in a book called Bialik Day to Day and are some of the truest and most authentic among Bialik's documented oral exchanges; devoid of any attempts at falsity, distortion or artificial embellishment, they present Bialik as he truly was.

When a dream of a full-scale municipal museum in Tel Aviv began to take shape Gliksberg was invited to serve on the Museum Committee representing painters and sculptors. In 1934 Gliksberg was among the founders of the Painters and Sculptors Association.

Awards and legacy
He was awarded the Dizengoff Prize in 1936, 1937 and 1956. His paintings can be found in museums, public and private collections throughout the world. After his death a street in Tel Aviv was named after him.

Writing
A memoir, Treasured in the Heart was published after his death.
Chaim Gliksberg Bialik Yom-Yom, Hotsaat Ha-Kibuts Ha-Meuhad, 1948 Tel Aviv

References 

1904 births
1970 deaths
People from Odesa
Belarusian Jews
Soviet emigrants to Mandatory Palestine
Jews in Mandatory Palestine
Israeli people of Belarusian-Jewish descent
Israeli artists
Burials at Kiryat Shaul Cemetery